The Antola Natural Regional Park (in Italian Parco naturale regionale dell'Antola) is a natural park in Metropolitan City of Genoa (Liguria, Italy). It gets the name from the highest mountain of the area, Monte Antola.

History 

The natural park was established by the l.r. (regional law, in Italian legge regionale) nr. 16, April 9, 1985 as modified by the l.r. nr. 12, February 22, 1995. Since April 30, 2014 the Environmental Management System of the park is certified according to ISO 14001 standards.

Geography 

Situated in the inland of the Italian Riviera between Genova and Rapallo, the park protects a scenic portion of the Ligurian Apennines. The protected area is mainly located near the border with Piemonte and south of the Apenninic watershed dividing Pianura Padana (tributary of the Adriatic Sea) from the Ligurian Sea drainage basin. It covers over 48 square kilometres (that is ), plus 5,832 ha under a lesser form of environmental protection named aree contigue (contiguous areas).

The park encompasses the uppermost part of four short valleys:

 Val Vobbia
 Val Pentemina
 Val Brevenna
 Val Trebbia.

Concerned municipalities 

The natural park is shared among twelve different municipalities:
Busalla, Crocefieschi, Fascia, Gorreto, Montebruno, Propata, Ronco Scrivia, Rondanina, Savignone, Torriglia, Valbrevenna, Vobbia.

Main summits of the park 

Among the highest summits located in the park can be cited Monte Antola (1597 m), Monte Buio (1,497 m) and Monte Prelà (1406 m). Also relevant for some aspects are Rocche del Reopasso (956 m), a rocky summit with interesting climbing routes and a via ferrata, or Monte Reale (902 m), bearing an old Catholic sanctuary on its top and a free mountain hut all-year open next to the church.

Wildlife
The most renowned among the animal species living in the park are wolves, that became extinct in the area around 1850 because of the increased number of inhabitants of that period. They reappeared around 150 years later coming from the central Apennine at the end of the 20th century, and are now an habitual presence in the protected area. They mostly prey on roe and fallow deer, which have also reappeared in the park in the last decades. Birds of prey are well represented by Buteo buteo, Accipiter nisus, Falco tinnunculus and Pernis apivorus. Quite common is the European green woodpecker and, close to the streams, Alcedo atthis (common kingfisher), while the population of red-legged partridge is shrinking due to the decreasing amount of farmland.

Transport
Antola park can be reached by car via motorway (Autostrada A7, exits of Busalla, Ronco Scrivia or Isola del Cantone) or trunk road (S.S. 35 dei Giovi, S.S. 226 di Valle Scrivia and S.S. 45 di Val Trebbia). It is also linked to Genova by the scenic Genova-Casella narrow-gauge railway.

Hiking 

Around 270 km of footpaths, mostly signposted, are available within the park. The Rifugio Parco Antola, a mountain hut located at 1460 m near the summit of monte Antola, was built by the Ente Parco and is now managed by the Club Alpino Italiano. It can accommodate up to 32 hikers or alpinists.

References

Bibliography

External links 

 Pages by the Park Authority on Parks.it
 Official site

Regional parks of Italy
Parks in Liguria
Protected areas established in 1989
Protected areas of the Apennines